is a Japanese softball player who won a bronze medal in the 2004 Summer Olympics.

External links
 
 

1980 births
Japanese softball players
Living people
Olympic softball players of Japan
Olympic bronze medalists for Japan
Softball players at the 2004 Summer Olympics
Olympic medalists in softball
Medalists at the 2004 Summer Olympics
21st-century Japanese women